Steenwijk (Low German: Steenwiek, Stienwiek English: Stenwick) is a city in the Dutch province of Overijssel. It is located in the municipality of Steenwijkerland. It is the largest town of the municipality.

Steenwijk received city rights in 1327. In the Eighty Years' War (1568–1648) it was conquered by the Spaniards in 1581, but regained by the Dutch in 1592.

Steenwijk was a separate municipality until 2001, when it merged with Brederwiede and IJsselham. The new municipality was first named "Steenwijk", but was renamed in 2003 to "Steenwijkerland".

Transport
Railway Station: Steenwijk

Gallery

References

External links

 Official site (in Dutch)

Cities in the Netherlands
Municipalities of the Netherlands disestablished in 2003
Populated places in Overijssel
Former municipalities of Overijssel
Steenwijkerland